The SM UB-48 was a German Type UB III submarine or U-boat in the German Imperial Navy during World War I. It was commissioned into the German Imperial Navy on 11 June 1917 as SM UB-48.

It operated as part of the Pola Flotilla and later the II Mediterranean U-boat Flotilla based in Cattaro. UB-48 was one of the most successful U-boats serving in the Mediterranean. The boat was assigned the number  in the Austro-Hungarian Navy. It was scuttled in Pola after the surrender of Austria-Hungary on 28 October 1918.

Construction

UB-48 was ordered by the GIN on 20 May 1916 and built by Blohm & Voss of Hamburg. Following less than a year of construction, it was launched at Hamburg on 6 January 1917. UB-48 was commissioned later that same year under the command of Wolfgang Steinbauer. Like all Type UB III submarines, UB-48 carried 10 torpedoes and was armed with a  deck gun. UB-48 had a displacement of  while surfaced and  when submerged. Her engines enabled her to travel at  when surfaced and  when submerged.

Summary of raiding history

References

Notes

Citations

Bibliography 

 

World War I submarines of Germany
1917 ships
Ships built in Hamburg
U-boats commissioned in 1917
U-boats scuttled in 1918
Maritime incidents in 1918
World War I shipwrecks in the Adriatic Sea
German Type UB III submarines